Pivovar Krakonoš is one of the oldest breweries in the Czech Republic. Founded in 1582 and located in Trutnov town, the annual production of light and dark beers exceeds 100,000 hectoliters.

In 1974, future Czech president Václav Havel worked here, and was inspired to write a theater play, Audience, whose story is situated in the brewery.

See also 
List of oldest companies

References 

Article contains translated text from Pivovar Trutnov on the Czech Wikipedia retrieved on 25 February 2017.

External links 
 

Breweries in the Czech Republic
Companies established in the 16th century
16th-century establishments in Bohemia
Trutnov
1582 establishments in the Habsburg monarchy